Shindara is a village in Kareli District, and the Shida Kartli region at the centre of Georgia. Shindara is at the northwestern edge of the Trialeti Range of the Lesser Caucasus mountains where they meet the river plain of the Shida Kartli lowlands.

See also 
 Shida Kartli

References 

Populated places in Shida Kartli